MS Zuiderdam  is a  owned and operated by Holland America Line (HAL). The prefixes of the four ships' names represent the four directions of the compass in Dutch.

The ship shares similar exterior dimensions with Carnival Cruise Lines' and Costa Cruises' . Cunard Line's  is an enlarged version of the same design, as is HAL's Signature class.

As with all Vista-class ships, Zuiderdam is equipped with a diesel-electric power plant and an Azipod propulsion system, and eighty-five percent of her staterooms have ocean views and sixty-seven percent have verandahs. Her art collection carries a Venetian theme throughout the ship; the most dazzling features figures in the time of Carnival in Venice, created by Daniel Ogier.

Service history

Zuiderdam was christened by American broadcaster Joan Lunden at Port Everglades on 14 December 2002. Between October to April, Zuiderdam largely runs a southern Caribbean itinerary which includes a half-transit of the Panama Canal through the Gatun Locks. From May to September, the vessel travels to Alaska or the Northern Europe/Baltic region.

On 9 June 2019, the ship's departure from the Kiel was delayed when members of climate activist group Smash Cruiseshit used smaller boats, blocking the seaport.

Technical information
The machinery spaces of Zuiderdam are vast and stretch along with two of its lowest decks for the most part of the vessel.

MS Zuiderdam is powered by a CODAG propulsion system encompassing five (three 16-cylinder and two 12-cylinder) Sulzer ZAV40S diesel engines (built under license by Grandi Motori Trieste, now owned by Wärtsilä, in Trieste, Italy) and a GE LM2500 Gas Turbine. Zuiderdam was the first Holland America Line ship to use a CODAG propulsion arrangement, a GE LM2500 turbine or ABB Azipod propulsors.  It is propelled by two 17.62 MW, 160 rpm synchronous freshwater-cooled ABB Azipod propulsors.

Past Zuiderdams
The first vessel with the "Zuider" prefix launched in 1912 as the 5,211-ton cargo ship Zuiderdijk; at the time, "dijk" or "dyk" was the suffix used for cargo vessels, "dam" was used for passenger ships.  She sailed between Rotterdam and Savannah, Georgia, for Holland America through 1922 as well as during World War I as a transport.

The second NASM ship to have the name prefix "Zuider", and the first to be whole "Zuiderdam", was launched from a shipyard in Rotterdam for outfitting in 1941. However, on 28 August 1941, she was damaged by a British air raid. The ensuing blaze was fought for at least two days with sergeant W. Ollesch from the German Fire Regiment "Sachsen" killed while fighting the fire aboard the ship on 30 August 1941. The Germans raised her hull and re-floated her by 25 July 1942 only to be scuttled in order to block the port of Rotterdam to Allied forces by 22 September 1944. She was raised a final time after World War II, but the ship was never completed.

References

Notes

Bibliography

External links 

 Official Zuiderdam page
 "Zuiderdam" – review by Douglas Ward in The Daily Telegraph, London.

Ships of the Holland America Line
Ships built in Venice
Panamax cruise ships
2001 ships
Ships built by Fincantieri